Sheykh Tomeh (also Romanized as Sheykh Ţo‘meh)is a village in Karkheh Rural District, Hamidiyeh District, Ahvaz County, Khuzestan Province, Iran. At the 2006 census, its population was 1,292, in 196 families.

References 

Populated places in Ahvaz County